Keklik, historically Zergil, is a village in the Nizip District, Gaziantep Province, Turkey. The village is inhabited by Kurds of the Reşwan tribe and had a population of 190 in 2021.

Gallery

References

Villages in Nizip District
Kurdish settlements in Gaziantep Province